Hopeton Barrett (born 19 May 1963) is a Jamaican cricketer. He played in two List A matches for the Jamaican cricket team from 1983 to 1986. He also played in five matches for the United States cricket team in the 1994 ICC Trophy.

See also
 List of Jamaican representative cricketers

References

External links
 

1963 births
Living people
American cricketers
Jamaican cricketers
Jamaica cricketers